Beaumont Shopping Centre is in Beaumont Leys, on the edge of Leicester. The  shopping centre is owned by British Land and managed by GVA.

History 
The Fletcher Mall portion of the property was sold to Cervidae in April 2021.

Facilities
There are three free car parks located within the main shopping area. The main shopping area has public toilets, Tesco also has some toilets located near the customer services desk.

Stores
Retailers currently occupying units with the centre are Boots, Iceland, Poundland (including Pep&Co), Shoe Zone, Superdrug, Aldi, Wilko, Greggs, Costa Coffee, Yours Clothing, Specsavers, Pets at Home, Cex, New Look, O2, Age UK Charity Shop and Sally Health&Beauty
 
Tesco Extra is the anchor tenant of the shopping centre located on the Bradgate Mall and features Tesco Phone Shop and Tesco Opticians.

Beaumont Market
The centre has an outdoor market area which opened in 1984. The market is open from Wednesday to Sunday. The main area is under cover and has over 60 stalls with a wide range of products on sale such as fruit and vegetables, games and DVDs, household items and general bric-a-brac stall. There is also usually a butchers van.

A car boot sale for used goods was held in the car park located next to the market area on Sundays between March and November although it was ceased as a result of the Covid-19 pandemic.

Other
Both Matalan and Buzz Bingo are located across the road but neither is officially part of Beaumont Shopping Centre.

Public transport
Beaumont Shopping Centre has a purpose built bus terminus that has seven stands served by a number of buses which run into and around the outskirts of Leicester.

References

External links
Beaumont Shopping Centre website

Buildings and structures in Leicester
Shopping centres in Leicestershire
Retail parks in the United Kingdom
Tourist attractions in Leicestershire